Cuneo Gilbert & LaDuca, LLP is a law firm with offices in Washington, D.C., New York City, St. Louis, and Alexandria.  Jonathan Cuneo is the lead partner of the firm along with co-partners Pamela Gilbert and Charles LaDuca.  The firm represents consumers, businesses, workers and governments through litigation, lobbying and public advocacy.

Landmark Cases 
Cuneo Gilbert & LaDuca, LLP represents clients in a range of civil and legislative matters.

Civil and Human Rights
Strip Search Cases - CGL has served as counsel in over twenty cases challenging the blanket strip search practices of such municipalities as Phoenix, Philadelphia, San Antonio, Pittsburgh, Newark, Buffalo, Trenton, and Atlantic City.

Many of these cases reached multimillion-dollar settlements.

Hungarian Gold Train - CGL successfully represented Hungarian Holocaust Survivors seeking restitution and an accounting against the United States government in the Hungarian Gold Train case, which was settled for $25.5 million in 2005 after nearly five years of litigation.  The settlement's terms also included an apology from the Bush Administration for the conduct of the U.S. Army.

Consumer Protection
"Joe Camel" Case - CGL's predecessor firm, Cuneo Law Group, PC, served as Washington counsel in the first case to challenge the "Joe Camel" cigarette advertising campaign.  The action was filed in California state court in 1991 well before the U.S. Attorney General began tobacco litigation.  This litigation led to the release of important  documents that revealed R.J. Reynolds Tobacco Company had studied under-aged smokers with a view toward selling cigarettes and consequently induced youths to start smoking through targeted advertising.

Prudential Case –CGL represented individual claimants against Prudential Insurance Company in post-settlement proceedings after a class action charging that Prudential had abused policyholders through deceptive sales practices. Over a period of eighteen months, the firm oversaw approximately 55,000 arbitration-like proceeding in this $4 billion settlement.

Kwikset Case - CGL partner Jonathan Cuneo successfully tried the “Kwikset, Made in the USA” case in 2001. After a trial victory, the Court of Appeal set the decision aside twice. CGL appealed to the California Supreme Court, and in 2010, Cuneo argued and won a 5 to 2 decision. That landmark decision established the principle that “labels matter” under California’s Unfair Competition and False Advertising laws and is now a landmark of American law.

Product Liability
Entran II - CGL represented homeowners whose Entran II radiant heating systems allegedly contained defective pipe, yielding a $346 million bi-national settlement, one of the largest product liability settlements in history.  On November 17, 2004, New Jersey District Court Judge Stanley Chesler gave final approval of this settlement.

Corporate and Financial Litigation
Enron - CGL served as Washington counsel for defrauded Enron investors  from 2002 through 2008.  This Enron Securities Litigation recovered over $7 billion, the largest in the history of federal securities litigation.  CGL Lawyers assisted the lead counsel in developing the theory of "scheme liability" and facilitated the filing of numerous amici briefs in support of this theory.

Privacy 
Metromail - CGL brought a path-breaking class action suit against Metromail for privacy violations surrounding supermarket questionnaires. After a woman in Ohio received a sexually suggestive letter from a maximum security inmate in Texas, it came to light that the company had subcontracted for Texas prisoners to “key” the questionnaire information. The firm settled the case for significant injunctive relief, and a cash pool of $15 million was made available to victims.

Lobbying 
PSLRA - On behalf of the National Association of Shareholder and Consumer Attorneys, Jonathan Cuneo, head partner at CGL, led a coalition that successfully prevented the evisceration of private actions under the securities laws. This multi-pronged effort, including lobbying, grassroots organizing, media outreach and paid media, lasted a full year. As a result, since the PSLRA was enacted, investors have been able to make some of the biggest recoveries in history, including Enron, Worldcom and Tyco.

Marketing 
Cuneo Gilbert & LaDuca, LLP is a major sponsor of the NASCAR Late Model Sports Car driven by professional driver Mike Darne.  Darne competes at Old Dominion Speedway in Manassas, VA driving car #21, and at Hickory Motor Speedway in Hickory, NC driving car #99.

See also 
 Joe Camel Case

References

External links 
Cuneo Gilbert & LaDuca website
Certainteed Shingle Settlement Website

Law firms established in 1989
Law firms based in Washington, D.C.